Denmark's Strongest Man is an annual strongman contest held in various locations in Denmark, and features exclusively Danish strength athletes. The contest was first held in 1983 with Sven-Ole Thorsen winning the title. Flemming Rasmussen holds 7 wins, and René Minkwitz holds 5 wins. Emil Jensen is the current champ.

Top 3 placings

{| class="wikitable"
!Year
!Champion
!Runner-Up
!3rd Place
|-
|1983 || Sven-ole Thorsen|| ||
|-
|1984 || Henrik Henning|| ||
|-
|1985 || colspan=4 align=center style="background: #708090;"|Event not held
|-
|1986 || colspan=4 align=center style="background: #708090;"|Event not held
|-
|1987 || Henrik Hening|| ||
|-
|1988 || Henrik Hening|| ||
|-
|1989 || Henrik Hening|| ||
|-
|1990 || colspan=4 align=center style="background: #708090;"|Event not held
|-
|1991 || Henning Thorsen || Henrik Ravn ||
|-
|1992 || Henning Thorsen || Henrik Ravn ||
|-
|1993 || Henrik Hening || Henning Thorsen || Bo Mortensen
|-
|1994 || Henrik Hening|| Bo Mortensen || Flemming Rasmussen
|-
|1995 || Flemming Rasmussen || || Bo Mortensen
|-
|1996 || Flemming Rasmussen || ||
|-
|1997 || Flemming Rasmussen || Bo Mortensen || René Minkwitz
|-
|1998 || Flemming Rasmussen || René Minkwitz || Torben Sørensen
|-
|1999 || Flemming Rasmussen || ||
|-
|2000 || Flemming Rasmussen || ||
|-
|2000 || René Minkwitz || ||
|-
|2001 || René Minkwitz || ||
|-
|2002 || Torben Andersen || ||
|-
|2003 || Flemming Rasmussen || ||
|-
|2004 || René Minkwitz || Flemming Bruntse || Torben Sørensen
|-
|2005 || René Minkwitz || Torben Sørensen || Flemming Jensen
|-
|2006 || René Minkwitz || Gamle Flemming || Nikolai Hansen
|-
|2007 || colspan=4 align=center style="background: #708090;"|Event not held
|-
|2008 || Jasmin Hajdarevic || Gregor Stenmar || Nikolai Hansen
|-
|2009 || Nikolai Hansen ||
|-
|2010 || Nicolai Hansen/Asbjørn Ettrup || Mikkel Leicht || Kim Haagen
|-
|2011 || Nikolai Hansen || Mikkel Leicht || Asbjørn Ettrup 
|-
|2012 || Nikolai Hansen || Mikkel Leicht || Thomas Kær 
|-
|2013 || Nikolai Hansen || Mikkel Leicht || Mads Rathmann Erenskjold 
|-
|2014 || Mikkel Leicht || Nikolai Hansen || Mads Rathmann Erenskjold 
|-
|2015 || Mikkel Leicht |||
|-
|2016 || Mikkel Leicht |||
|-
|2017 || Mikkel Leicht |||
|-
|2018 || Mikkel Leicht |||
|-
|2019 || Mikkel Leicht |||
|-
|2021 || Emil Jensen || Erik Thomsen || Mikkel Leicht ||
|-
|2022|| Anders Aslak Pedersen || Oliver Storgaard || Magnus Berg ||

References

National strongmen competitions
Sports competitions in Denmark